Jean (or Joseph)-Michel-Pascal Buhan (17 April 1770 – 24 February 1822) was an 18th-century French lawyer, poet, polemist and playwright.

Biography 
The son of a lawyer, trustee prosecutor of Bordeaux, he became himself a lawyer in his hometown and began to plead in 1792. In March 1793, he decided to engage in the Vendee armies in a volunteer battalion from Gironde and there became general Boulard's aide.
Suffering from significant sight difficulties, he joined the administration in charge of military transport and army convoys in the western Pyrenees.

As one of the propagators of the resistance in the Midi departments, he was outlawed at the Convention for the defense of the Girondins. Thanks to various encounters he made in that position, he launched into literature. He left a few comedies and poems published in papers as well as polemical works.

After the Coup of 18 Brumaire, he became a lawyer in Bordeaux in 1811, was part of the Customs Court. Censor and President of the Bar association (1821), he died in Bordeaux February 24, 1822.

Leaving behind four children he had with his niece he had married in need, his friends managed to get to his widow a pension of 1,200Frs for his actions in favor of the First Restoration.

Works 
1790: Lettre des administrateurs du directoire du département de la Gironde
1796: Revue des auteurs vivants grands et petits, coup d’œil sur la république des lettres en France, 6e année de la République française, par un Impartial, s'il en est
1797: Il faut un état, ou La revue de l'an six, proverbe in 1 act, in prose and in vaudevilles, with René de Chazet and François-Pierre-Auguste Léger
1799: Gilles aéronaute, comedy in 1 act and 2 parts, with Armand Gouffé and Noël Aubin
1800: Réflexions sur l'étude de la législation, et sur la meilleure manière d'enseigner cette science

Bibliography 
 Nicolas Le Moyne des Essarts, Les siècles littéraires de la France, 1801, (p. 99)
 Louis-Gabriel Michaud, Biographie universelle ancienne et moderne, Tome 59, supplément, BOR-CAL, 1835, (p. 420-421) 
 Ludovic Lalanne, Dictionnaire historique de la France, 1872, (p. 402)

External links  
 Jean-Michel-Pascal Buhan on data.bnf.fr

18th-century French dramatists and playwrights
18th-century French lawyers
18th-century French male writers
18th-century French poets
1770 births
Writers from Bordeaux
1822 deaths
French male poets